Judea "Juju" Watkins is an American women's basketball player at Sierra Canyon School in Chatsworth, California. She was named Gatorade Girls Basketball Player of the Year for 2021-22 in California. In July 2022, she was named MVP of the 2022 FIBA Under-17 Women's Basketball World Cup in Hungary. In November 2022, she committed to play with the University of Southern California Trojans women's basketball team starting in 2023.

References

Year of birth missing (living people)
Living people
American women's basketball players
Basketball players from Los Angeles
Sierra Canyon School alumni